The Intrusive Suite of Sonora Pass (also, the Sonora Pass Intrusive Suite) is one of several intrusive suites in Yosemite National Park. These also include

 Fine Gold Intrusive Suite
 Intrusive Suite of Buena Vista Crest
 Intrusive Suite of Jack Main Canyon
 Intrusive Suite of Merced Peak
 Intrusive Suite of Yosemite Valley
 Tuolumne Intrusive Suite

The Intrusive Suite of Sonora Pass is ~92-89 Ma, and is the northernmost of four large Late Cretaceous zoned intrusive suites in the central Sierra Nevada batholith.

Rock types

On a large scale, it is composed of Kinney Lakes granodiorite and the younger Topaz Lake granodiorite.

On a finer scale, the Intrusive Suite of Sonora Pass is made of light-gray, coarse-grained biotite granodiorite, plus granite with roughly equant, well-formed potassium feldspar phenocrysts composing about 2–10% of the rock. The mafic mineral content is about 10%.

References

External links

 A Masters thesis

Geology of California
Geology of Yosemite National Park